Douglas dos Santos (born 18 February 1982), simply known as Douglas, is a retired Brazilian professional footballer who played as an attacking midfielder.

Career
Prior to being signed for Al Wasl FC for R$11m, Douglas was owned by two clubs; each owning 50% of his player card, the first club was Corinthians where he used to play before moving to Al Wasl, and the second was São Caetano. He played only half a season with Al Wasl in the 2009–10 season before moving back to Brazil to play for Grêmio.
Douglas was first picked for Brazil's national team on October 29, 2010 to play a friendly match against Argentina.

On 27 October 2020, 38-year old Douglas announced his retirement from football. In February 2021, Douglas returned to Grêmio to play for their futsal team.

Career statistics

FIFA Club World Cup

Honours
Criciúma
Campeonato Brasileiro Série B: 2002
Campeonato Catarinense: 2005
Campeonato Brasileiro Série C: 2006

Corinthians
Campeonato Brasileiro Série B: 2008
Campeonato Paulista: 2009, 2013
Copa do Brasil: 2009
Copa Libertadores: 2012
FIFA Club World Cup: 2012
Recopa Sudamericana: 2013

Grêmio
Campeonato Gaúcho: 2010
Copa do Brasil: 2016
Copa Libertadores: 2017

Avaí
Campeonato Catarinense: 2019

References

External links

1982 births
Living people
People from Criciúma
Brazilian footballers
Association football midfielders
Campeonato Brasileiro Série A players
Campeonato Brasileiro Série B players
Campeonato Brasileiro Série C players
Criciúma Esporte Clube players
Associação Desportiva São Caetano players
Grêmio Foot-Ball Porto Alegrense players
Sport Club Corinthians Paulista players
CR Vasco da Gama players
Avaí FC players
Süper Lig players
Çaykur Rizespor footballers
UAE Pro League players
Al-Wasl F.C. players
Copa Libertadores-winning players
Brasiliense Futebol Clube players
Brazil international footballers
Brazilian expatriate footballers
Brazilian expatriate sportspeople in Turkey
Brazilian expatriate sportspeople in the United Arab Emirates
Expatriate footballers in Turkey
Expatriate footballers in the United Arab Emirates
Sportspeople from Santa Catarina (state)